Desislava Dimitrova (born 19 June 1972) is a Bulgarian sprinter. She competed in the women's 4 × 100 metres relay at the 1996 Summer Olympics.

References

External links
 

1972 births
Living people
Athletes (track and field) at the 1996 Summer Olympics
Bulgarian female sprinters
Olympic athletes of Bulgaria
Sportspeople from Sofia
Olympic female sprinters
20th-century Bulgarian women
21st-century Bulgarian women